Franz Eckl (11 January 1896 – 19 November 1966) was an Austrian footballer. He played in seven matches for the Austria national football team from 1919 to 1928.

References

External links
 
 

1896 births
1966 deaths
Austrian footballers
Austria international footballers
Place of birth missing
Association football forwards
First Vienna FC players
FC St. Gallen players
Austrian expatriate footballers
Expatriate footballers in Switzerland
Austrian football managers
FC Zürich managers
Austrian expatriate football managers
Expatriate football managers in Switzerland